Duas Vidas is a Brazilian telenovela produced and broadcast by TV Globo. It premiered on 13 December 1976 and ended on 13 June 1977, with a total of 154 episodes. It's the eighteenth "novela das oito" to be aired on the timeslot. It is created and written by Janete Clair and directed by Daniel Filho, Gonzaga Blota and Jardel Mello.

Cast 
 Francisco Cuoco - Victor Amadeu
 Betty Faria - Leda Maria
 Susana Vieira - Cláudia
 Luis Gustavo - Oswaldo
 Arlete Salles - Gilda
 Sadi Cabral - Seu Menelau (o Grego)
 Mário Gomes - Dino César
 Ruth de Souza - Elisa
 Flávio Migliaccio - Túlio
 Isabel Ribeiro - Sônia
 Cecil Thiré - Tomás
 Nívea Maria - Hebe
 Neuza Amaral Sarah
 Alberto Perez - Raul Barbosa
 Elza Gomes - Rosa Amadeu
 Stephan Nercessian - Maurício
 Zezé Motta - Jandira
 Milton Moraes - Alexandre
 Vera Gimenez - Zuleika Aguiar
 Moacyr Deriquém - Heitor
 Isolda Cresta - Vera
 Hélio Ary Dário - Sena
 Heloísa Helena - Vírginia
 Jayme Barcellos - Geraldo
 Suzana Faini - Ana Paula
 Cleyde Blota - Roberta
 Dary Reis - Seu Barros
 Ana Ariel - Madame Henriqueta Xavier
 Augusto Olímpio - Edgar Oliveira
 Laura Soveral - Leonor Oliveira
 Diogo Vilela - Sandro
 Myrian Rios - Aparecida (Cidinha)
 Yaçanã Martins - Shirley
 Sérgio Fonta - Renato
 Christiane Torloni - Juliana
 Glória Pires - Letícia

References 

TV Globo telenovelas
1976 telenovelas
Brazilian telenovelas
1976 Brazilian television series debuts
1977 Brazilian television series endings
Portuguese-language telenovelas